Mykyta Kamenyuka (born 3 June 1985) is a retired Ukrainian professional football midfielder who is most known for playing for Zorya Luhansk in the Ukrainian Premier League.

Kamenyuka is a product of the Youth Sportive School Ukrayina Luhansk. His first trainer was Yuriy Robochyi. He moved back from Illichivets to Zorya during the 2008–09 summer transfer season.

References

External links

 Official Website Profile
 Profile on Football Squads

1985 births
Living people
Ukrainian footballers
Footballers from Luhansk
FC Hirnyk Rovenky players
FC Mariupol players
FC Zorya Luhansk players
Ukrainian Premier League players
Ukrainian First League players
Ukrainian Second League players
Ukraine international footballers
Association football defenders
NK Veres Rivne players